Matthijs de Koning (born 18 March 1949) is a Dutch racing cyclist. He rode in the 1971 Tour de France.

References

External links
 

1949 births
Living people
Dutch male cyclists
Place of birth missing (living people)